The Ahn Trio is a classical piano trio composed of three sisters: Angella (violin), Lucia (piano), and Maria (cello) Ahn; Lucia and Maria are twins. Born in Seoul, Korea, they moved to New York City in 1981, and began their training at the Juilliard School. The sisters formed a trio while they were earning their master's degrees at Juilliard. The Ahn Trio is known for its performance of new classical music, genre-crossing programming, and collaborations with other artists.

Media recognition

The trio achieved widespread recognition in the United States in 1987, when Time magazine featured them in a cover story about Asian-American "Whiz Kids". Since then, the trio has appeared in magazines multiple times, acknowledging that they seek to "get in the mainstream magazines as classical artists" in order to promote classical music's image. In 2003, they were selected by People magazine as three of the "50 Most Beautiful People" and have been featured in Vogue, GQ, and in ads for Gap and Anne Klein. They have been photographed by photographers Arthur Elgort, Ellen von Unwerth, and Walter Chin. The trio is often noted for their attractive appearance and fashion choices.

Repertoire and collaborations

The Ahn Trio performs a diverse set of genres, ranging from new classical music to arrangements of popular songs. In addition to recognized works of the classical piano trio repertoire, such as that found on their first two albums (one of which, Dvořák, Suk, Shostakovich: Piano Trios, earned them a German Echo award) the sisters have performed arrangements of popular music (including songs by David Bowie and the Doors) and have commissioned works by composers including Michael Nyman, Mark O'Connor, Roberto Carnevale, and Ronn Yedidia.

The Ahn Trio's collaborations include an acoustic project with alternative rock band Tata Bojs, with whom they performed live at the Czech Grammys and recorded an album, smetana, and performances with the David Parsons Dance Company. They appeared on MTV's "Unplugged" with Bryan Adams, which inspired the title of their album Ahn-Plugged.  "Ahn-Plugged" has also been used by the trio as a term for their commissioning and performing new works.

Lullaby For My Favorite Insomniac features collaborations with vocalists Susie Suh and Ema Brabcová and with DJs Tao of Sound, DJ Spooky, Superdrive, and Ra.D. for four remix tracks on the album.

Performances and appearances

The Ahn Trio performs frequently throughout the United States, and also gives workshops and master classes at middle schools, high schools, and colleges, seeking to bring new audiences to classical music. Their performances often include visually appealing staging and programs that are announced and discussed from the stage by the trio.

Maria Ahn recorded guest cello parts for the album April Rain by Dutch symphonic metal band Delain. The record came out in March 2009.

In December 2010, the Ahn Trio appeared in the TED Conference as part of the TEDWomen series, performing Skylife by David Balakrishnan and Oblivion by Astor Piazzolla.

Their recording of "The Heart Asks Pleasure First" by Michael Nyman, from their album Lullaby For My Favorite Insomniac, appeared in So You Think You Can Dance in the show's final episode of season 8 on August 10, 2011.

The Ahn Trio performed at the White House State Dinner honoring South Korean President Lee Myung-bak on October 13, 2011.

Discography

References

External links
 Official website

American classical musicians of Korean descent
Chesky Records artists
EMI Classics and Virgin Classics artists
Piano trios
South Korean emigrants to the United States
American twins
South Korean twins
Musical groups established in 1989
Sibling musical trios